Gosanimari (also known as Khalisa Gosanimari) is both a village and an archaeological site in Dinhata I CD block, in the Dinhata subdivision of the Cooch Behar district of West Bengal, north-eastern India. The name of this site was taken from the modern grampanchyat name of the Dinhata subdivision.

Geography

Location

Area overview
The map alongside shows the eastern part of the district. In Tufanganj subdivision 6.97% of the population lives in the urban areas and 93.02% lives in the rural areas. In Dinhata subdivision 5.98% of the population lives in the urban areas and 94.02% lives in the urban areas. The entire district forms the flat alluvial flood plains of mighty rivers. 

Note: The map alongside presents some of the notable locations in the subdivisions. All places marked in the map are linked in the larger full screen map.

Excavation

Excavation Site
The site contains ruins of Rajpat which served as the capital of Kamata kingdom, occupying a large area of ancient Kamarupa and Vanga.

Excavation history
Dr. Buchanan Hamilton in 1808 had left a vivid description along with a sketch of the mound and site which still hold good in authenticity. According to Dr. R.D. Banerjee, Kamata kingdom stood as buffer between eastern Kamrupa and the Bengal Sultanate in the 15th century CE. He is of the opinion that the Khens might have built Gosanimari, but it is also possible that these Mongoloid people only used the ruins of fortification which had been built several centuries earlier. After the independence Archaeological Survey of India took over the responsibility of this site.

Findings
It is believed parts of the ancient kingdoms important temples and buildings are now buried under a large grass grown mound. So far two large stone wells have been excavated, along with a large stone walls and a number of idols too. Pottery work includes vases, bowls, basin, dish, beaker etc. The facial and physiognomical delineation indicate the idols are the products of c. 11th and 12th century AD and influenced by Pala-Sena school of art.

Rulers
In 1260, it became the seat of power of Kamata ruler Sandhya, who shifted his capital from Kamarupanagara (present-day North Guwahati) due to the frequent clashes he faced from the Kacharis from the south-east border in what is modern-day Assam. Later it was held by the Khen dynasty until 1498 AD, when Hussein Shah of Gaur  unsurp power by defeating Nilambar of Kamata. From the early 16th century, it was ruled by the Koch dynasty founded by Biswa Singha.

When the English came along they Anglicized the term Koch to Cooch, hence the name Cooch Behar State.

Culture

The Kamteswari temple was built by Maharaja Pran Narayan in 1665.

Demographics
As per the 2011 Census of India, Khalisa Gosanimari had a total population of 6,410.  There were 3,295 (51%) males and 3,115 (49%) females. There were 788 persons in the age range of 0 to 6 years. The total number of literate people in Khalisa Gosanimari was 3,993 (71.02% of the population over 6 years).

Healthcare
Gosanimari Block Primary Health Centre, with 30 beds at Gosanimari, is the major government medical facility in the Dinhata I CD block.

References

External links

Villages in Cooch Behar district
Archaeological sites in West Bengal
History of Cooch Behar